Yu Wo, born Chen Wenxuan (陳玟瑄), is a Taiwanese light novelist, best known for creating 1/2 Prince.

Career & personal life

After graduating high school, she attended National Cheng Kung University from 2002–2006. She got her start in writing by reading online novels. A large number of these books had male protagonists, with women serving as sidekicks. She began posting stories online with this archetype flipped. Min-Hsien Cultural Enterprise Co. Ltd. took note of Yu Wo's postings and agreed to publish her first light novel in 2004, titled 1/2 Prince. The light novel was illustrated by Ya Sha. After her light novel was published, it became successful in Taiwan, and was adapted into a comic by Choi Hong Chong, which was serialized in the magazine Dragon Youth Comic in 2004. Kill No More was then published the following year. She graduated from her university in 2006 and published Romance RPG and GOD, which were illustrated by Yuyue Boxin(玉越博幸) and Guang Shi (光矢) respectively. In 2007, she published her second popular series entitled The Legend of Sun Knight. It was also successful in Taiwan and became a comic in 2010, published by The One Comics. The Legend of Sun Knight manhua was adapted by Os Rabbit Cat. The third of Yu Wo's light novels to become popular was Hunting of the Shaded Guardian. Alongside 1/2 Prince, Ya Sha illustrated the novel versions of Kill No More, The Legend Of Sun Knight, and Hunting of the Shaded Guardian. No Hero was published in 2008 as an indirect sequel to Hunting of the Shaded Guardian with a different main character but in the same fictional universe. It was illustrated by Shan Gui (山鬼) until the 7th volume, and by Lü Chuanming (綠川明) from the 8th volume onwards. Magical Exchange was published in the same year. Black Flower was published in 2009 and illustrated by Monto C3. Female Warrior, a prequel to The Legend of Sun Knight, was published in 2012 and illustrated by Wu Ling (午零). Human Doll Contract was published in 2013 and illustrated by Jiu Yue Zi (九月紫).

Several of Yu Wo's works have been repackaged, i.e. the original story split into a different number of volumes with different cover illustrations. The 12 pocket volumes of 1/2 Prince were illustrated by Ikusabe Lu and published from 2006 to 2007. The repackaged version of 1/2 Prince was illustrated by Xiao Qiang COCO (小強COCO) and first published in 2011. For Kill No More, the repackaged version was published from 2009 to 2010 and illustrated by Xiao Tie(小鐵). The repackaged version of Hunting of the Shaded Guardian was illustrated by Blaze.

For spin-offs, the sequel to The Legend of Sun Knight, titled 39, was illustrated by J.U., the artist who also illustrated the repackaged version of the main story and the Simplified Chinese version.

Other languages
The Legend of Sun Knight and No Hero began publication in Thai in 2009.

Bibliography

Light novels
Color Key

 – Original/repackaged version of the main story
 – Side-story
 – Sequel
 – Prequel

Manhua

Notes
A  The sequel to The Legend of Sun Knight is about the 39th generation of the Twelve Holy Knights.
B  No Hero is the retitled sequel to Hunting of the Shaded Guardian.
C  Female Warrior is the retitled prequel to The Legend of Sun Knight. It is about the 1st generation of the Twelve Holy Knights.

References

External links
List of all of Yu Wo’s works

1984 births
Living people
Taiwanese women writers
Writers of young adult literature
Women science fiction and fantasy writers
National Cheng Kung University alumni
Women writers of young adult literature